Rhinobothryum lentiginosum, commonly known as the Amazon banded snake, is a species of snake in the family Colubridae. The species is endemic to South America.

Geographic range
R. lentiginosum is found in Bolivia, Brazil, Colombia, Ecuador, French Guiana, Guyana, Paraguay, Peru, and Venezuela.

References

Further reading
Boulenger GA (1896). Catalogue of the Snakes in the British Museum (Natural History). Volume III., Containing the Colubridæ (Opisthoglyphæ and Proteroglyphæ) ... London: Trustees of the British Museum (Natural History). (Taylor and Francis, printers). xiv + 727 pp. + Plates I-XXV. (Rhinobothryum lentiginosum, pp. 82–83).
Freiberg M (1982). Snakes of South America. Hong Kong: T.F.H. Publications. 189 pp. . (Rhinobothryum lentiginosum, p. 109).
Rojas-Morales, Julián Andrés (2012). "On the geographic distribution of the false coral snake, Rhinobothryum bovallii (Serpentes: Dipsadidae), in Colombia – a biogeographical perspective". Salamandra 48 (4): 243–248.
Scopoli, Ioannes Antonius (1785). Deliciae Florae et Faunae Insubricae seu Novae, aut Minus Cognitae Species Plantarum et Animalium quas in Insubria Austriaca ... Pars III [Volume 3]. Ticini. vi + 87 pp. + Plates I-XXV. (Coluber lentiginosus, new species, p. 41 + Plate XX, figure 2). (in Latin).

Reptiles described in 1785
Reptiles of Peru
Reptiles of Colombia
Reptiles of Brazil
Reptiles of Bolivia
Reptiles of Venezuela
Reptiles of Guyana
Reptiles of Ecuador
Reptiles of French Guiana
Reptiles of Paraguay